Lincoln County Courthouse is the building in Stanford, Kentucky, the county seat of Lincoln County, where trial courts conduct their affairs, and other county governmental offices are located. The building was added to the United States National Register of Historic Places in 1976.

History

Stanford, originally called Logan's Fort, was named the county seat of Lincoln County in 1786. 
The current building was constructed in 1909 at the site of the original building. This structure was the fourth building used as courthouse.

Never destroyed by fire or flooding, the courthouse contains original documents dating back to 1781, and are the oldest courthouse records in the state.

Architecture

Constructed in the Beaux-Arts architectural style, the building features include a cupola with a clock on each side at the top of the building. The Ionic order portico fronting includes round brick columns.

References

External links

Lincoln County Kentucky, Government web site

County courthouses in Kentucky
National Register of Historic Places in Lincoln County, Kentucky
Frank Pierce Milburn buildings
Clock towers in Kentucky
Courthouses on the National Register of Historic Places in Kentucky
Beaux-Arts architecture in Kentucky
1909 establishments in Kentucky
Government buildings completed in 1909
Stanford, Kentucky